Liolaemus capillitas, Hulse's tree iguana, is a species of lizard in the family  Liolaemidae. It is native to Argentina.

References

capillitas
Reptiles described in 1979
Reptiles of Argentina